Louise Darnell Alba Abuel (born December 27, 2003) is a Filipino teen actor and commercial model. He first appeared as Kevin Delgado in the television series 100 Days to Heaven, Young Jao in Princess and I, Pikoy in Juan dela Cruz, and as the young Franco Hidalgo in Ikaw Lamang. He is currently under contract with ABS-CBN. In 2020, he won the Best Actor award in the Asian Film category of the 18th Dhaka International Film Festival.

Filmography

Television/Digital

Films

References

External links
 

2003 births
Living people
21st-century Filipino male actors
ABS-CBN personalities
TV5 (Philippine TV network) personalities
Filipino male child actors
Filipino male television actors
Male actors from Manila
Star Magic personalities